Canaã (Portuguese for "Canaan") is a municipality (município) in the state of Minas Gerais in Brazil. The population is 4,548 (2020 est.) in an area of 175 km².

See also
 List of municipalities in Minas Gerais

References

Municipalities in Minas Gerais